David Johnson, also known as the World Famous Bushman, is a busker who scares  passers-by along Fisherman's Wharf in San Francisco, active since 1980.  Johnson hides motionless behind some eucalyptus branches and waits for unsuspecting people to wander by.  When they approach, he shakes the bush towards the unsuspecting tourists and startles them, sometimes making gruff "oogah-boogah" noises, while in-the-know observers giggle. Crowds gather to watch him work, often including those he has previously scared. The Bushman typically operates toward the western end of the Wharf (at Jefferson and Hyde Streets or thereabouts), well to the west of the Grotto. Johnson used to work with or, at different points in time, as a rival to a second Bushman, Gregory Jacobs, until the death of Jacobs in 2014.

Crowds usually watch Johnson across the street from where he usually sits, to see him entertain people.

In a "good year", Johnson claims to earn $60,000. However, he cited the same figure to one of his victims (after said victim chided him) in 1992.  At one point, he employed a bodyguard to protect himself against attacks by the unamused, distract his targets, and to alert him to the approach of elderly people so he could avoid scaring them.

The police have received a number of complaints about the Bushman, and Fisherman's Wharf merchants have tried to shut him down.  In 2004, he was charged with four misdemeanors, but a jury cleared him.  The District Attorney subsequently dropped several remaining public nuisance complaints.

Although engaging in his street performance utilizing the bush as a prop, as of the mid 1990s, Johnson did not formally refer to himself as "The Bushman" until he was befriended by then Alameda residents John and daughter Alison Nowakowski, who would refer to him as such. Eventually, the name stuck and Johnson adopted the name as his formal street performing moniker.

Two Bushmen
From the 1990s until the death of Gregory Jacobs in 2014, two World Famous Bushmen operated on Fisherman's Wharf both as a team and as separate acts, each claiming to be the first to come up with the act. Initially, the two worked together, with Johnson as performer, and Jacobs working the crowd and collecting money.

A 2009 article in SFSU's Xpress Magazine says:
Many people are unaware that there are, in fact, two Bushmen. When Gregory Jacobs first came up with this gig, he recruited David Johnson, a man he met at Fisherman's Wharf. As they worked together they developed a close friendship. Johnson's deep voice scares those who unknowingly pass by the man-made bush. Back then, Johnson would hold the bush and Jacobs would tell the jokes, entertain those watching the action, and collect the tips. It has been about fifteen years, and now they are complete enemies. Jacobs accuses Johnson of running off with their money. Jacobs tries to avoid any conflicts with Johnson by not working where and when he is." 

However, San Francisco Chronicle ran an article in 1999 suggesting that Johnson was the original Bushman, joined by Jacobs in the 1990s. That article, which caused the act to become a nationwide sensation after picked up by newspapers across the United States, reports that Jacobs joined Johnson in a bodyguard role as well as to help with the act: "'I look after him,' says Gregory Jacobs, who recently joined the act as a full partner. 'I watch his back.' 

Greg Jacobs was featured in the video "Act (Diogenes)" by the artist Whitney Lynn. Jacobs is also the subject of a short film, The Bush Man. Gregory Jacobs died February 23, 2014, due to heart failure at the age of 60 years old, whilst Johnson remained active until 2019.

See also

 Busking (U.S. case law)
 Frank Chu
 Emperor Norton

References

External links

Video of the Bushman at work
Documentary of the World Famous Bush Man
Another video of The World Famous Bush Man

African-American people
American street performers
Culture of San Francisco
Living people
Year of birth missing (living people)
Homeless people
Fisherman's Wharf, San Francisco